Outwood Academy City is a co-educational secondary school with academy status located on Stradbroke Road in Sheffield, South Yorkshire, England.

The school is operated by Outwood Grange Academies Trust, the principal is Andrew Downing.

History

Sheffield Pupil Teacher Centre (SPTC)
Before being renamed as The City School, in 1969, the Stradbroke Road establishment had been (1964–1969) City Grammar School (CGS). CGS itself had previously occupied premises in Sheffield city centre where, until 1941, it had been the Sheffield Pupil Teacher Centre (SPTC). The original institution dates from the 1890s.

The Elementary Education Act 1870, commonly known as Forster's Education Act, set the framework for schooling of all children between the ages of 5 and 13 in England and Wales and established local school boards. The main function of these bodies was to use local rates (taxes) to finance the building of schools in cases where the range of existing establishments was inadequate. A driving force behind the Act was a perceived need for Britain to remain competitive in the world by being at the forefront of manufacture and improvement. The only existing formal education until this time had been in church schools and some ragged schools for the poor. Between 1870 and 1880, 3,000–4,000 schools were started or taken over by school boards.

The resulting new schools consequently required larger numbers of teachers. Furthermore, higher standards of educational attainment came to be expected in schools, so the quality of the teachers also needed to be raised. It became necessary, therefore, to develop efficient and affordable methods of improving the standards of  teacher training. The solution adopted, along the 1870s, 80s and 90s, was the education of "pupil teachers" for a four-year period (14–18 years of age) in specific training centres.

In Sheffield, the number of such centres peaked at 11 establishments in the period 1881 to 1884, but it was later decided that the system would become more efficient with the centralisation of teacher training activities of this type in just one Centre. In 1894 the school board purchased the premises formerly occupied by the old Free Writing School in School Croft, in the city centre, and in February of that year J. G. Picknet became head of the "Central Higher School". Two years later it was decided that this old building should be scheduled for demolition and that a new centre should be constructed at a nearby site at the corner of Orchard Lane and Holly Street.

The new Sheffield Pupil Teacher Centre building was inaugurated on 9 October 1899 by Spencer Cavendish, 8th Duke of Devonshire. An alumni association, the "Holly Guild" was formed around 1904 and the first official number of the school magazine "The Holly Leaf: A Chronicle of the Sheffield City Grammar School" was printed in 1907 (up to this time it had been distributed in handwritten format).

Pupil numbers declined from 376 in 1906 to 143 in 1912, but subsequent rapid increases in the period 1915 to 1920 led to the necessity to contract thirteen additional members of staff and classes also had to be held at other premises at Carver Street, Townhead Street, Arundel Street (College of Arts and Crafts) and the Central School in addition to the Centre itself. In 1922 the centre implemented an annual admission of four forms of boys and girls who had qualified via the 11-plus, and it effectively became a secondary school.

Sheffield City Grammar School
The idea of pupil-teachership lost support over the following two decades and Sheffield was one of the last two surviving urban authorities to maintain a centre of this type. (The system was eventually discontinued in the city in 1944). The SPTC moved into premises at Orchard Lane on 11 September 1933 and changed its name to the City Secondary School shortly after the appointment of the new head master, Stephen Northeast, in 1935. In 1941 it was again renamed, becoming City Grammar School.

The United Kingdom's secondary education structure was organised according to the Tripartite System between the 1944 Butler Education Act and 1976. This was known colloquially as the grammar school system. Secondary schools were divided into three categories, grammar schools, technical schools and secondary modern schools. Pupils were allocated to each according to their performance in the 11-plus examination.

The new Sheffield City Grammar School adopted the phoenix as its symbol and maintained the traditional SPTC school song "Carmen Ilicis", composed by Edward H. Taylor and Alan W. Goodfellow, the first verse and chorus of which are:

The Oak, the Ash, the bonny Ivy tree
Are known in story, famed in song ;
But we who know thee, certain are
That, search the woodland near or far,
Ye ne'er will find, tho' seek ye long,
A bush so worthy song or eulogy
As Centre's Holly - ever green.

Semper discamus
Ut doceamus
Nil nisi verum, nil nisi verum.
Sive docemur,
Sive docemus,
Vitam degamus
Ut maneamus
Omnes amici, omnes amici ! 

A reporter, writing about the City Grammar School in "Yorkshire Life" magazine, in 1960 commented, "... to me it is one of the city's most interesting schools ... it was co-educational at a time when it was considered revolutionary for the sexes to mingle in class ... there is a solid, down-to-earth atmosphere about it that fits the character of the city, and its pupils have the friendliness and assurance one expects from Sheffield's hard-working, self-respecting citizens ... ".

CGS continued at the city centre site until 19 February 1964 when the first assembly was held for the 760 pupils at the newly completed, £300,000, Stradbroke Road premises. (Sheffield City Council data for 1959/60 had evaluated the cost of the Orchard Lane buildings and furniture, at that time, to be £80,121 14s. 3d.).

The City School
The April 1969, Spring Edition of the Holly Leaf carried an editorial which began with "NOTICE IS HEREBY GIVEN...that the City Council of Sheffield propose to re-organise, from September 1969, the City Grammar School to form a co-educational comprehensive school." It continued, regarding the choice of a name for the new institute; "For a time we looked like becoming Bashforth School...good sense and the persistent efforts of the Head-master prevailed, and September will see the creation of City School." The editorial finishes; "Good luck, City School."

In 2007 Ofsted put the school into special measures, but following a June 2008 inspection this decision was rescinded. In 2012 the school was again placed into special measures. David Lack took over as a temporary headteacher.

Between 2010 and 2012 as part of the Building Schools for the Future (BSF) programme the original 1964 concrete buildings were largely demolished and the 1969 extension buildings were comprehensively refurbished. A new three storey building was constructed by contractors Vinci and located to the immediate east of the original site on fields that were previously used for hockey. The site of the 1964 building was converted into a multi-use games area (MUGA) and staff car parking.

Outwood Academy City
In January 2014 following a compulsory academy conversion, the City School became part the Outwood Grange Academy Trust and changed its name to Outwood Academy City.

Headmasters and principals

SPTC & City Grammar School
 1899 - 1919, Arthur J. Arnold
 1919 - 1931, Joseph Batey, principal
 1931 - 1934, Alfred Meetham, principal
 1935 - 1950, Stephen Northeast, headmaster
 1950 - 1955, Ronald H. Davies, headmaster
 1956 - 1970, Lindsay Harvatt, headmaster

The City School
 1970–1979, Mr. Hughes, headteacher
 1979–1986, Alan Debes, headteacher
 1986–1999, Ed Gabbani, headteacher
 1999–2007, Julie Warne, headteacher
 2007–2008, David Lack, headteacher
 2008–2012, Matt Percival, headteacher

Outwood Academy City
 2012–2014, Julie Slater, principal
 2014–2017, Richard Brooke, principal
 2017–present, Andrew Downing, principal

Notable former pupils

 Joseph Charles Wildsmith, footballer for Sheffield Wednesday 
 Jarvis Cocker, musician
 Jamie Reeves (born 3 May 1962), strongman and former winner of the title of World's Strongest Man
 Phil Turner, footballer
 Danny Willett, golfer

City Grammar School 
 Tim Ellis, Bishop of Grantham from 2006–13
 David Ford (footballer)
 Roy Hattersley, Labour politician, MP from 1964-97 of Birmingham Sparkbrook
 Jim Marshall, Labour MP from 1974–83 and 1987-2004 for Leicester South 
 Sir Peter E. Middleton GCB - English banker, former Chancellor  of the University of Sheffield (1999 - 2015)
 Sir Roger Singleton, Chief Executive from 1984-2006 of Barnardo's 
 Mark White (musician), with ABC (band)

References

External links
 
 City Grammar School Alumni Website

News items
 Arson attack in November 2003
 Fire in 2003

Educational institutions established in the 1890s
Secondary schools in Sheffield
 
1890s establishments in England
Academies in Sheffield
City